Problepsis craspediata is a moth of the  family Geometridae. It is found in New Guinea.

Subspecies
Problepsis craspediata craspediata (New Guinea)
Problepsis craspediata frosti Prout, 1938 (Kei Islands)
Problepsis craspediata rotifera Prout, 1916 (New Guinea)

References

Moths described in 1897
Scopulini
Moths of New Guinea